Waikiki is an outer southern suburb of Perth, the capital city of Western Australia. It adjoins and is closely associated with Safety Bay in the City of Rockingham. A prime landmark is the Waikiki Village shopping centre on Read Street, the main road linking Rockingham with Warnbro and Port Kennedy.

The suburb is named after the Honolulu neighborhood of Waikiki and was chosen by the developer of the area. The name was officially gazetted on 5 April 1974.

References

Suburbs of Perth, Western Australia
Suburbs in the City of Rockingham